Beervlei Dam is a dam in the Groot River, Eastern Cape, South Africa. The main purpose of the dam is to provide flood absorption. The Karoo sediments in the area contain a lot of salts and it has been found that lengthy storage of water results in high water salinity. Any flood water is used as quickly as possible by the downstream irrigators and the reservoir is kept empty for extended periods.

See also
List of reservoirs and dams in South Africa
List of rivers in South Africa

References 
 List of South African Dams from the Department of Water Affairs and Forestry (South Africa)

Dams in South Africa
Dams completed in 1957